John Webbe may refer to:

John Webbe (died 1557) (died 1550s), MP for Dover
John Webbe (died 1571) (1530s–1571), MP for Salisbury
 John Webbe (martyr)

See also
John Webb (disambiguation)